Xayacatlán may refer to:

Xayacatlán de Bravo, Puebla
San Jerónimo Xayacatlán, Puebla
Xayacatlán Mixtec language